Eric Lee Shanteau (born October 1, 1983) is an American former competition swimmer who won two gold medals as a member of winning United States relay teams at the World Championships.  He was a member of the 2008 and 2012 U.S. Olympic teams, and earned a gold medal as a member of the winning U.S. team in the 4×100-meter medley relay at the 2012 Summer Olympics in London.  Shanteau formerly held the 4×100-meter medley relay world record as a member of the U.S. team that competed at the 2009 FINA World Championship in Rome.

Early life
Shanteau was born in Snellville, Georgia. He attended Parkview High School in Lilburn, Georgia, where he became a national swimming champion while maintaining a perfect 4.0 grade point average (GPA).

College career
Shanteau attended Auburn University, where he was an 11-time All-American for the Auburn Tigers swimming and diving team. At the 2003 World University Games, Shanteau won the silver medal in the 400-meter individual medley.  At the 2005 World University Games, Shanteau won gold in both the 200-meter and 400-meter individual medley, making him the first American to sweep both events.

International career
At the 2004 United States Olympic Trials in Long Beach, California, Shanteau placed third in the 200-meter and 400-meter individual medley events, just missing a place on the Olympic roster in both events.  Shanteau also placed eleventh in the 200-meter breaststroke.

Cancer diagnosis and 2008 Olympic Games
On July 3, 2008, Shanteau placed second in the 200-meter breaststroke at the 2008 U.S. Olympic Swimming Trials, guaranteeing himself a spot on the team set to compete in Beijing, China. The week before, Shanteau was informed that he had testicular cancer, but chose to compete in the meet regardless.  He competed in the 200-meter breaststroke at the 2008 Summer Olympics in Beijing, where, despite missing the finals by thirteen one-hundredths (0.13) of a second, he posted a personal best time.  After returning to the United States, he underwent surgery to remove the cancerous testicle. Shanteau is now in remission and active in cancer awareness.

2009
At the 2009 U.S. National Championships and World Championship Trials in Indianapolis, Indiana, Shanteau placed second to Mark Gangloff in the 100-meter breaststroke with a time of 59.45. In the 200-meter individual medley, Shanteau placed second to Ryan Lochte with a time of 1:56.00, making him the third fastest performer ever in that event. Shanteau won the 200-meter breaststroke final in 2:08.01, breaking his own American record he set in the preliminaries of the meet. All of Shanteau's final times in Indianapolis were personal bests, and he qualified to swim all three of his individual events at the 2009 World Aquatics Championships in Rome.

At the World Championships in Rome, Shanteau placed second in the 200-meter breaststroke (2:07.65), third in the 200-meter individual medley (1:55.36), and fourth in the 100-meter breaststroke (58.98). Shanteau was also part of the U.S. 4×100-meter medley relay team Aaron Peirsol, Michael Phelps and David Walters, which won the gold medal in a new world record of 3:27.28.

2012 Olympic Games
At the 2012 U.S. Olympic Trials in Omaha, Nebraska, the qualifying event for the U.S. Olympic team, Shanteau made the U.S. Olympic team by finishing second in the 100-meter breaststroke.  At the 2012 Summer Olympics in London, he placed fourth in the second semi-final of the 100-meter breaststroke and did not advance to the final.  He earned a gold medal by swimming the breaststroke leg for the winning U.S. team in the preliminaries of the 4×100-meter medley relay.

Personal bests

Awards
 Golden Goggle Award, Perseverance Award: 2008
 Golden Goggle Award, Athlete Humanitarian Award: 2012

See also

 List of Auburn University people
 List of Olympic medalists in swimming (men)
 List of United States records in swimming
 List of World Aquatics Championships medalists in swimming (men)
 List of world records in swimming
 World record progression 4 × 100 metres medley relay

References

External links
  (archive)
 
 
 
 

1983 births
Living people
American male breaststroke swimmers
American male medley swimmers
Auburn Tigers men's swimmers
Olympic gold medalists for the United States in swimming
Sportspeople from Austin, Texas
People from Snellville, Georgia
Sportspeople from the Atlanta metropolitan area
Swimmers at the 2008 Summer Olympics
Swimmers at the 2012 Summer Olympics
World Aquatics Championships medalists in swimming
World record holders in swimming
Medalists at the FINA World Swimming Championships (25 m)
Medalists at the 2012 Summer Olympics
Universiade medalists in swimming
People from Lilburn, Georgia
Universiade gold medalists for the United States
Universiade silver medalists for the United States
Medalists at the 2003 Summer Universiade
Medalists at the 2005 Summer Universiade
21st-century American people